Daniel Alessandro Saggiomo Mosquera (born 2 July 1998) is a Venezuelan footballer who plays for Atlanta on loan from Argentinos Juniors.

Career statistics

Club

Notes

References

1998 births
Living people
Venezuelan footballers
Venezuelan expatriate footballers
Venezuela under-20 international footballers
Venezuela youth international footballers
Association football forwards
Caracas FC players
Venezuelan Primera División players
Tercera División players
Venezuelan people of Italian descent
Venezuelan expatriate sportspeople in Spain
Expatriate footballers in Spain